The 16th Guldbagge Awards ceremony, presented by the Swedish Film Institute, honored the best Swedish films of 1979 and 1980, and took place on 22 September 1980. To Be a Millionaire directed by Mats Arehn was presented with the award for Best Film. The awards for Best Director and Best Actress were not presented.

Awards
 Best Film: To Be a Millionaire by Mats Arehn
 Best Director: not awarded
 Best Actor: Peter Lindgren for I Am Maria
 Best Actress: not awarded
 The Ingmar Bergman Award: Lena Olin

References

External links
Official website
Guldbaggen on Facebook
Guldbaggen on Twitter
16th Guldbagge Awards at Internet Movie Database

1980 in Sweden
1980 film awards
Guldbagge Awards ceremonies
September 1980 events in Europe
1980s in Stockholm